If Only It Were True is the first novel by the French author Marc Levy. It was released in 1999 by Éditions Robert Laffont, and was translated into English the following year. The novel has been adapted into an array of motion pictures, including the 2005 American film Just Like Heaven.

Plot

If Only it Were True is set against the backdrop of San Francisco and tells the story of Lauren Kline, a young, pretty, medical resident, completely devoted to her work in the emergency room of San Francisco Memorial Hospital. She works round-the-clock dealing with patients until she gets into a serious car accident. As a result of the accident, Lauren enters a coma. She "wakes" to awareness outside of her still comatose body and is frustrated to learn that she cannot communicate with anyone. She chooses to spend most of her time in her old apartment, where she is discovered by Arthur, the new tenant. Only he can see, hear, or touch her. After some initial disbelief on his part, Arthur agrees to help Lauren.

Sequel 

A sequel to the novel entitled Vous revoir was published in 2005.

Adaptations 

The novel has been adapted into several films including the American film Just Like Heaven and the Indian films Vismayathumbathu and I See You.

References

1999 French novels
French romance novels
Novels set in San Francisco
French novels adapted into films
1999 debut novels
Romantic fantasy novels